The Real Estate Adventures of Sandy & Maryse is a Canadian television series which premiered on September 8, 2008 on the W Network. Produced by Mountain Road Productions the series is the story of two women, motivated by a desire for change and a love of home renovation, take on the challenge of flipping a house for fun and profit.

Awards

|-
| 2009
| The Real Estate Adventures of Sandy & Maryse
| New York Festivals, Category: International TV Broadcasting
|  Finalist Award
|-

External links 
 http://www.realestateadventures.tv
 http://www.mountainroad.ca/mrp/portfolio/real_estate_adventures_of_sandy_and_maryse.php

2008 Canadian television series debuts
2000s Canadian reality television series
Television shows filmed in Ottawa
W Network original programming